Images in a Convent is a 1979 sexploitation film by Italian cult filmmaker Joe D'Amato starring Paola Senatore, Marina Hedman and Donald O'Brien.

The film belongs to the 'nunsploitation' subgenre. It contains strong scenes of graphic violence relating to demonic possession and is among few films containing original hardcore pornography that already passed Italian censorship in 1979 and were projected in some Italian cinemas. It includes explicit lesbianic depictions of digital penetration and cunnilingus.

Plot 
Behind the walls of a secluded convent, the nuns commit sexual acts at night with each other, while living in fear that their Mother Superior may learn of their transgressions.

One day, an injured man appears at the convent and the sisters take him in. One by one, the nuns become attracted to the man and take turns visiting his room at night. Unbeknownst to them, Satan has also entered the convent and is turning the nuns into horny sinners.

Finally, an exorcist is sent to the convent to drive out Satan and restore godliness to the monastery's lustful inhabitants.

Cast 
Credited:
 Paola Senatore: Isabella
 Marina Hedman: suor Marta
 Paola Maiolini: suor Consolata
 Angelo Arquilla: Lieutenant Guido Bencio
 Aïché Nana: Sister Angela, the Mother Superior
 Maria Rosaria Riuzzi: Sister Giulia
 Giovanna Mainardi: Sister Veronica
 Ferrucio Fregonese: Cardinal Del Lario
 Plard Sylviane Anne Marie
 Pietro Zardini: Cesco, the gardener
 Brunello Chiodetti: Don Ascanio, Isabella's uncle
 Donald O'Brien: Father Arnoldo, the exorcist  
Uncredited:
 Giuseppe Curia: one of the two bandits who rape Sister Marta
 Sisto Brunetti: the other bandit

Production
The film's working title was La casa del dio sconosciuto (literal translation: "The house of the unknown god"). 
The initial cast as officially deposited was Gloria Guida as Isabella and Gabriele Tinti as Guido Bencio, Paola Arduini as Sister Lucrezia and Anna Maria Romoli as Sister Marta.

Literary and cinematic influences
On the pages preceding the copy of the script deposited at the Ministerio Dello Spettacolo on February 24, 1979, it says that the film is "very loosely inspired by Prosper Mérimée's La Vénus d'Ille before quoting Blaise Pascal's saying, "The last function of reason is to recognize that there are an infinity of things which surpass it".

The main cinematic influence was Walerian Borowczyk's Interno di un convento (1977; literally: Interior of a Convent; English title: Behind Convent Walls), which claimed to be influenced by Stendhal's Promenades romaines just as Immagini di un convento claims to be inspired by La Religieuse by Denis Diderot. However, the only parallels between the film and Diderot's novel are the general immorality of the clergy, the arrival of an aristocratic novice without vocation at a convent, and the wounded officer.

Release

Theatrical
The film was released in Italy on August 7, 1979, and was screened in 4 cities (including Turin and Milan) with a total of 14.307 spectators in the first year.

In France, the film was released theatrically in February 1981 under the title Les amours interdites d'une religieuse.

Home video
In Italy, the film was released on VHS in its soft version by Avo, Vega Video, and New Video, and in a hard version by Shendene & Moizzi, which however lacks the introductory part with Paola Senatore and Brunello Chiodetti. 

In the Netherlands, the Italian version was published under the title Intieme Kloosterbeelden by VFP (Video for Pleasure). In Greece, the hard version was published on VHS in Italian with Greek subtitles with a few cuts, among them the sequence with Senatore and Chiodetti.

In the United States, the film was released on June 14, 2005, as Images in a Convent on DVD by Media Blasters in its hard version from which three minutes of Marina Ambrosini's scene of diabolical possession were cut. It contains the film only in its Italian dub with non-removable yellow English subtitles.

Film connections 
In 1986, D'Amato directed another nunsploitation film, Convent of Sinners.

Reception
When he first saw the film at the red light cinema "Il Filodrammatico" in Trieste, film critic Marco Giusti remembers being impressed, also because he did not expect real penetrations; "after all, it was about nuns...".

References

Bibliography

External links 

Images in a Convent at Variety Distribution

1979 films
1970s Italian-language films
Films directed by Joe D'Amato
Nunsploitation films
Italian sexploitation films
Italian pornographic films
1970s erotic films
Films set in Italy
Films scored by Nico Fidenco
1970s Italian films